Nick Savides (born October 25, 1957) is an American realism artist known for his figurative paintings, particularly scenes depicting New York City. According to Saatchi Art, he is "inspired by the works of Edward Hopper, the calm energy within his art captures a palpable sensation of light and place". His paintings involve urban scenes, architecture landscapes, nature, and figures, and  portraiture.

His art 
After studying under Paul Georges at Brandeis University and learning painting techniques, Savides began his career as a realist painter.

Savides's speciality is painting realistic urban landscapes. The elements found in his cityscape paintings include architecture, nature, murals, graffiti, people. When his first began, he mainly painted persons inside buildings, with Jan Vermeer's work being an influence.

Savides is a volunteer educator with ArtWorks NYC, teaching art literacy in the NYC public school system and leading museum tours in the Brooklyn Museum.

Savides described his work as followed: 

As of 2015, Savides lives in Brooklyn, New York.

Publications 

 Nick Savides – Resilience in NYC, 2022
 Nick Savides – New York/Paris, Nabi Press, 2009
 Nick Savides – Paintings, Nabi Press, 2008

Exhibitions 

 SoNo Fine Art, South Norwalk, 2022, “Art for Lovers”
 Bowery Gallery, New York, Invitational, 2022, “Resilience in NYC”
 EV Gallery, New York, 2022, “You’re Always Something to Find”
 Union Gallery at Wagner College, Staten Island, NY, 2018, “NYCityscapes”
 Shakespeare & Associates, Milford, PA, 2018
 Charaple Gallery, New York, 2016, “Recent Paintings”
 The Good Gallery, Kent, CT, 2016, “Expressions”
 Berkeley College Art Gallery, New York, 2015, “New York Icons”
 Berkeley College Art Gallery, New York, 2014, “New York”
 Edward Hopper House Art Center, Nyack, NY, 2014, February Artist of the Month
 Geary Gallery, Darien, CT, 2013, “Nick Savides:  Contemplating Time, Light, and Space”
 Berkeley College Art Gallery, Brooklyn, 2012, Retrospective, “Nick Savides: Reflections on Realism, Paintings from 1979-2012”
 Berkeley College Art Gallery, New York, 2011, “Paris”
 Nabi Gallery, New York, 2009, “New York – Paris”
 Gallery Alexie, New York, 2002, “Canyons”
 Gallery Alexie, New York, 2000, “Recent Paintings”
 Pene de Bois Gallery, New York, 1986
 State of New York at Stony Brook, 1980

Collections 

 Rose Art Museum, Brandeis University, Waltham, MA, and many private collections

Recognition 

 Louis P. Rabinovitz Endowment Art Award
 Winner of Edward Hopper House’s #HopperSpring competition, 2017
 William and Mary Review (front and back cover), 2015
 Berkeley College Gallery, Brooklyn, 2011, Changes in Brooklyn – 1st Place in show

External link 
Website

References 

1957 births
Living people
American realist painters
Brandeis University alumni